The IPHWR-700 (Indian Pressurized Heavy Water Reactor-700) is an Indian pressurized heavy-water reactor designed by the Bhabha Atomic Research Centre. It is a Generation III reactor developed from earlier CANDU based 220 MW and 540 MW designs. It can generate 700 MW of electricity. Currently there are 6 units under construction and 10 more units planned, at a cost of INR 1.05 trillion (US$ 14 billion total or US$2000 per kWe).

Development 
PHWR technology was introduced in India in the late 1960s with the construction of RAPS-1, a CANDU reactor in Rajasthan. All the main components for the first unit were supplied by Canada. India did the construction, installation and commissioning. In 1974, after India conducted Smiling Buddha, its first nuclear weapons test, Canada stopped their support of the project. This delayed the commissioning of RAPS-2 until 1981.

After Canada withdrew from the project, research, design and development work in the Bhabha Atomic Research Centre and Nuclear Power Corporation of India (NPCIL) enabled India to proceed without assistance. Some industry partners did manufacturing and construction work. Over four decades, fifteen 220-MW reactors of indigenous design were built. Improvements were made in the original CANDU design to reduce construction time and cost. New safety systems were incorporated. Reliability was enhanced, bringing better capacity factors and lower costs. 

To get economies of scale, NPCIL developed a 540 MW design. Two of these were constructed at the Tarapur Atomic Power Station. 

After a redesign to utilise excess thermal margins, the 540 MW PHWR design achieved a 700 MW capacity without many design changes. Almost 100% of the parts of these indigenously designed reactors are manufactured by Indian industry.

Design

Like other pressurized heavy-water reactors, IPHWR-700 uses heavy water (deuterium oxide, D2O) as its coolant and neutron moderator. The design retains the features of other standardized Indian PHWR units, which include:

Two diverse and fast acting shutdown systems
Double containment of reactor building
A water filled calandria vault
An integral calandria – end shield assembly
Zr-2.5% Nb pressure tubes separated from respective calandria tubes
A calandria tube filled with carbon dioxide (which is recirculated) to monitor pressure tube leak
It also has some new features as well, including:
Partial boiling at the coolant channel outlet
Interleaving of primary heat transport system feeders
A system to remove passive decay heat
Regional protection from over power
A containment spray system
A mobile fuel transfer machine
A steel lined containment wall

The reactor has less excess reactivity. Therefore, it does not need neutron poison inside the fuel or moderator. These designs handle the case of a loss of coolant accident such as occurred in the Fukushima Daiichi nuclear disaster.

Operation
The reactor fuel uses natural uranium fuel with Zircaloy-4 cladding. The core produces 2166 MW of heat which is converted into 700 MW of electricity at a thermal efficiency of 32%. Because there is less excess reactivity inside the reactor, it needs to be refuelled continually during operation. The reactor is designed for an estimated life of 40 years.

Unit 3 of Kakrapar Atomic Power Station was connected to the grid on 10 January 2021.

Reactor fleet

Technical specifications

See also
 IPHWR, a class of Indian PHWRs.
 IPHWR-220, earlier lower power variant of IPHWR-700
 CANDU, predecessor to Indian PHWR designs
 AHWR-300, thorium fuelled PHWR design for the Indian Three stage nuclear power programme
 India's three-stage nuclear power programme
 Nuclear power in India

References 

Nuclear power reactor types